Jun Bong-chan (Hangul:전봉찬; born 21 February 1994) is a South Korean badminton player from Gangwon-do. He graduated from Dong-eui University and later joining Samsung Electro-Mechanics badminton team. Jun was the runner-up at the 2014 Osaka International tournament in the men's doubles event partnered with Kim Duk-young. Together with Kim, he then won the Thailand International Challenge after beat Indonesian pair in the final.

Achievements

BWF International Challenge/Series 
Men's doubles

  BWF International Challenge tournament
  BWF International Series tournament

References

External links 
 

1994 births
Living people
Sportspeople from Gangwon Province, South Korea
South Korean male badminton players